NA-222 Tando Muhammad Khan is a constituency for the National Assembly of Pakistan.

Members of Parliament

2018-2022: NA-228 Tando Muhammad Khan

Election 2002 

General elections were held on 10 Oct 2002. Naveed Qamar of PPP won by 53,075 votes.

Election 2008 

General elections were held on 18 Feb 2008. Naveed Qamar of PPP won by 84,041 votes.

Election 2013 

General elections were held on 11 May 2013. Naveed Qamar of PPP won by 100,095 votes and became the member of National Assembly.

Election 2018 

General elections were held on 25 July 2018.

See also
NA-221 Hyderabad-III
NA-223 Badin-I

References

External links 
Election result's official website

NA-222